Vincenzo Fagiolo (5 February 1918 in Segni – 22 September 2000)  was an Italian cardinal and President of the Pontifical Council for Legislative Texts from 1990 until 1994.

Biography
Fagiolo was educated at the Seminary of Segni, the Seminary of Anagni and at the Pontifical Lateran University, earning doctorates in theology and canon law. He was ordained on 6 March 1943, and worked in the Diocese of Rome from 1943 to 1971.

As a young priest at the parish of Saints Fabiano and Venanzio, Father Fagiolo assisted Father Pietro Palazzini, vice rector of the Pontifical Major Roman Seminary, in sheltering Jews from the Nazis, on the grounds of the Basilica of St. John Lateran. For this Fagiolo, Palazzini were honored in 1983 as "Righteous Among the Nations" by Yad Vashem.

He attended the Second Vatican Council as an expert. Pope Paul VI appointed him Archbishop of Chieti-Vasto on 20 November 1971. He served as Vice-President of the Episcopal Conference of Italy from 1979 until 1984. Fagiolo was honoured by Yad Vashem as Righteous Among the Nations in 1983. He resigned the pastoral government of the archdiocese 15 July 1984. On 15 December 1990, Pope John Paul II named him President of the Pontifical Council for Legislative Texts. He was created and proclaimed Cardinal-Deacon of S. Teodoro in the consistory of 26 November 1994. He was replaced as president of the Pontifical Council on 19 December 1994. He died on 22 September 2000.

References

External links
Vincenzo Fagiolo at Yad Vashem website

1918 births
2000 deaths
People from Segni
Participants in the Second Vatican Council
20th-century Italian cardinals
Archbishops of Chieti
Pontifical Roman Seminary alumni
20th-century Italian Roman Catholic archbishops
Italian Righteous Among the Nations
Catholic Righteous Among the Nations
Dicastery for Legislative Texts
Cardinals created by Pope John Paul II
Pontifical Lateran University alumni